Mona Mansour is an American playwright of Middle Eastern descent. She has been a member of the Public Theater's Emerging Writers Group and a Playwrights' Center Core Writer. She is currently a resident playwright at New Dramatists. Mansour often writes about the Middle East, and she has frequently collaborated with English director Mark Wing-Davey. In addition to her theater work, Mansour has written for the television shows Queens Supreme and Dead Like Me.

Produced works
 Urge for Going - Public Theater (New York, 2011) (Public LAB production)
 The Hour of Feeling - Humana Festival at Actors Theatre of Louisville (2012)
 The Way West - Steppenwolf Theatre (Chicago, 2014); Marin Theatre Company (San Francisco, 2015); LAByrinth Theater Company (New York, 2016)

Awards and honors
 2012 Whiting Award
 2013 Sky Cooper New American Play Prize for The Way West
 2014 Middle East America Playwright Award

Notes

External links
Author Website
Profile at The Whiting Foundation

Living people
Year of birth missing (living people)
American women dramatists and playwrights
21st-century American women writers
21st-century American dramatists and playwrights